"Close to Me" is a song by English rock band the Cure, released in September 1985 as the second and final single from their sixth album, The Head on the Door.

Content
Three versions of "Close to Me" were released in 1985, including the original album version, the 7-inch single mix version and the 12-inch extended mix version. The album version does not feature the brass section part present on all of the other versions, which was adapted from a traditional New Orleans funeral march melody and played by horn section Rent Party for the single mix. The 7-inch version also includes a long creaking sound of a door closing at the beginning, which originated from the music video shot for the song by director Tim Pope, which features the band trapped in a wardrobe falling off a cliff into the English Channel.

Music video
The music video is written and directed by the band's frequent music video director Tim Pope. It consists of the band all inside a wardrobe on the edge of a cliff at Beachy Head. Following the musical scheme of the song, which builds up instrumentally, all the band members are inside the wardrobe, but not playing instruments. Boris Williams is clapping to the beat, keyboardist Lol Tolhurst is playing a very small, handheld keyboard, and Porl Thompson on the top shelf is plucking a comb to represent the short high sounds in the song. Bassist Simon Gallup does not play, and instead appears to be tied up. Tim Pope later revealed that Gallup had a light bulb in his mouth to create a "lit from within" feel, and the cloth was there to hide the wire. Robert Smith then comes from the back of the wardrobe and sings, also playing with finger puppets, which appear to be voodoo dolls of the band members, as when he moves them, the corresponding member moves. He then becomes more violent with the dolls, shaking them around heavily, which in turn causes the band members to hit into the sides of the wardrobe, which eventually results in the wardrobe falling off the cliff and into the sea. As they go into the sea, the wardrobe fills up slowly with water, like a capsized ship, but the band members continue to play their "instruments." The video ends with the wardrobe full of water and a band member pushing a rubber duck across the screen.

The music video was rated 13th on the 20 to One TV show, aired on Australia's Nine Network on 4 March 2007, which rated the most distinctive music videos.

Robert Smith said of making the video: "It was the most uncomfortable 12 hours that I've ever spent. He [Tim Pope] ended up dropping the wardrobe – with us still in it – into a huge tank filled with 1000 gallons of water. Watching it you'd think is was fun, but all I could think about was dying a slow, painful death".

Release
"Close to Me" was released on 13 September 1985 as the second single from the band's sixth album, The Head on the Door. The single peaked at number four in Ireland and also reached number seven in Australia and number 24 in the UK Singles Chart. It was remixed in 1990 for their remix album Mixed Up, and the remix was released as a single, peaking at number 13 on the UK Singles Chart and number 97 on the Billboard Hot 100 chart in the US in January 1991.

Track listings
7-inch single
 "Close to Me" (remix) – 3:38
 "A Man Inside My Mouth" – 3:07

10-inch single
 "Close to Me" (remix) – 3:38
 "A Man Inside My Mouth" – 3:07
 "New Day" – 4:08
 "Stop Dead" – 3:21

12-inch single
 "Close to Me" (extended remix) – 6:35
 "A Man Inside My Mouth" – 3:07
 "Stop Dead" – 3:21

Personnel
 Robert Smith – vocals
 Lol Tolhurst – keyboards
 Porl Thompson – keyboards
 Simon Gallup – bass guitar
 Boris Williams – drums
  Rent Party – brass section (credited as "horns")

Charts

Weekly charts

Year-end charts

Certifications

Close to Me · Remix

"Close to Me · Remix" is the name given to the remixed version of the song, released as a single in October 1990 to promote the album Mixed Up. It was made available in two different versions, the "Closer Mix", included on the 12-inch and the limited edition CD single, and the "Closest Mix", included on the 7-inch and the regular edition CD single. Both versions were available together on the cassette release. The "Closest Mix" was also included on the singles compilation Galore in 1997. It reached number 13 in the UK and 97 in the US. Both the "Closer Mix" and the "Closest Mix" were remixed by Paul Oakenfold and Steve Osborne for the 1990 album Mixed Up. The "Closest Mix" is the edited version of the "Closer Mix".

Music video
There is also a music video for the version of the song that appeared on Mixed Up. The video picked up where the original video ended, with the wardrobe crashing down the cliffside and sinking to the bottom of the sea. Robert exits first and is attacked by an octopus (seen playing the horns later in the video). After his struggle, the other band members try to flee as well, and are attacked by a starfish. The video ends without any of the band members reaching the surface, though they could see a boat overhead.

Track listings
7-inch
 "Close to Me" (Closest mix)
 "Just Like Heaven" (Dizzy mix)

12-inch and CD
 "Close to Me" (Closer mix)
 "Just Like Heaven" (Dizzy mix)
 "Primary" (Red mix)

Cassette single
 "Close to Me" (Closer mix)
 "Just Like Heaven" (Dizzy mix)
 "Close to Me" (Closest mix)
 "Primary" (Red mix)

Charts

References

External links
 

The Cure songs
1985 singles
1985 songs
1990 singles
Fiction Records singles
Music videos directed by Tim Pope
Song recordings produced by David M. Allen
Song recordings produced by Mark Saunders
Songs written by Robert Smith (musician)